The Eagle Mine is an abandoned mine near the abandoned town of Gilman and about one mile south east of Minturn in the U.S. state of Colorado.

The mining began in the 1880s, initially for gold and silver but predominantly zinc during later stages of its operation. The mine closed in 1984 and became an Environmental Protection Agency (EPA) Superfund site.

After the closure of the mine and the abandonment of Gilman, a  area, which included 8 million tons of mine waste, were designated a Superfund site by the EPA and placed on the National Priorities List in 1986. The mine had been owned by the New Jersey Zinc Company, in its later years a subsidiary of Gulf+Western. Viacom International was identified by the EPA as the successor in interest to the mine. According to the EPA, the mining operations left large amounts of arsenic, cadmium, copper, lead, and zinc in the soil, and led to large fish kills in the Eagle River and threatened drinking water in the town of Minturn downstream on the Eagle River. The clean-up plan, implemented beginning in 1988 included plugging and flooding the Eagle Mine, collecting and treating mine and ground water in a new treatment plant, as well as removing, treating and capping the mine waste products. A report by the EPA in 2000 concluded that clean-up operations had substantially reduced public health risks and improved the water quality in the Eagle River. The State of Colorado also has pursued separate parallel efforts at cleanup and has reached agreements with Viacom regarding treatment of the site.

See also
List of Superfund sites in Colorado
Mining in the United States

References

External links
 EPA Report 1998 ROD/R08-98/079 - includes mine history.

Superfund sites in Colorado
Mines in Colorado
Geography of Eagle County, Colorado
Zinc mines in the United States